The 1900 Calgary municipal election took place on December 10, 1900 to elect a Mayor and nine Aldermen to sit on the seventeenth Calgary City Council from January 7, 1901 to January 6, 1902. The election for Mayor was very close, with the Calgary Herald reporting James Stuart Mackie defeating his opponent Silas Alexander Ramsay by a single vote.

Results

Mayor
James Stuart Mackie - 217 votes
Silas Alexander Ramsay - 216 votes

Councillors

Ward 1
James Alexander McKenzie - 124 votes
Solomon Sheldwyn Spafford - 111 votes
Thomas Alexander Hatfield - 106 votes
William Pittman Jr. - 65 votes
Spoiled - 5 votes

Ward 2
John Jackson Young - 163 votes
Richard Benjamin O'Sullivan - 105 votes
John Creighton - 86 votes
Robert Cadogan Thomas - 82 votes
Spoiled - 1 vote

Ward 3
Thomas Underwood - 91 votes
John Emerson - 78 votes
Joseph Edward Eckersley - 74 votes
William Charles Gordon Armstrong - 65 votes
Spoiled - 0 votes

School trustees
Arthur Leslie Cameron - 232 votes
Robert John Hutchings - 207 votes
Richard Benjamin O'Sullivan - 182 votes

See also
List of Calgary municipal elections

References

Sources
Frederick Hunter: THE MAYORS AND COUNCILS  OF  THE CORPORATION OF CALGARY Archived March 3, 2020

Politics of Calgary
Municipal elections in Calgary
1900 elections in Canada
1900s in Calgary